Enteromius huguenyi is a species of ray-finned fish in the genus Enteromius.

It lives in freshwater in Guinea and Liberia.

The fish is named in honor of Bernard Hugueny, ecologist and limnologist, at the IRD (Institut de Recherche pour le Développement, Paris).

Footnotes 

 

Enteromius
Taxa named by Rémy Bigorne
Taxa named by Christian Lévêque
Fish described in 1993